Jog Biyog is a popular Bengali language novel of Ashapurna Devi. This story initially named as Baje Khoroch was published by Calcutta Book Club in 1953 and the plot is adapted into number of Indian films.

Plot
The story revolves with the last life crisis of Jamini Mohan and his wife. After the retirement Jamini Mohan and his wife Santoshini continued to be despised in the family of their earning sons. At this time, Gobinda, an orphan of the distant relative, became their mental hope. After facing various humiliation from their blood relationship Jamini Mohan died and as the mother of three sons, Santoshini became a burden to this family. Eventually Gobinda became Santoshini's absolute refuge.

Adaptations
 Jog Biyog (1953)
 Padikkadha Medhai (1960)
 Aatma Bandhuvu (1962)
 Mehrban (1967)
 Baala Bandana (1971)
 Jog Biyog (1984)
 Swarg (1990)
 Indra Bhavanam (1991)
 Bhai Hela Bhagari (1994)
 Annadata (2002)

References

1953 novels
Novels set in Kolkata
Novels set in Bengal
20th-century Indian novels
Indian Bengali-language novels
Indian novels adapted into films